Dominick Argento (October 27, 1927 – February 20, 2019) was an American composer known for his lyric operatic and choral music. Among his best known pieces are the operas Postcard from Morocco, Miss Havisham's Fire, The Masque of Angels, and The Aspern Papers. He also is known for the song cycles Six Elizabethan Songs and From the Diary of Virginia Woolf; the latter earned him the Pulitzer Prize for Music in 1975. In a predominantly tonal context, his music freely combines tonality, atonality and a lyrical use of twelve-tone writing. None of Argento's music approaches the experimental, stringent avant-garde fashions of the post-World War II era.

As a student in the 1950s, Argento divided his time between the United States and Italy, and his music is greatly influenced by both his instructors in the United States and his personal affection for Italy, particularly the city of Florence. Many of Argento's works were written in Florence, where he spent a portion of every year. He was a professor at the University of Minnesota in Minneapolis. He frequently remarked that he found residents of that city to be tremendously supportive of his work and thought his musical development would have been impeded had he stayed in the high-pressure world of East Coast music. He was one of the founders of the Center Opera Company (now the Minnesota Opera). Newsweek magazine once referred to the Twin Cities as "Argento's town."

Argento wrote fourteen operas, in addition to major song cycles, orchestral works, and many choral pieces for small and large forces. Many of these were commissioned for and premiered by Minnesota-based artists. He referred to his wife, the soprano Carolyn Bailey, as his muse, and she frequently performed his works. Bailey died on February 2, 2006.

In 2009, Argento was awarded the Brock Commission from the American Choral Directors Association.

Early life and education 
The son of Sicilian immigrants, Argento was born and grew up in York, Pennsylvania. He found his music classes in elementary school to be "fifty-minute sessions of excruciating boredom". Upon graduating from high school, he was drafted into the Army and worked for a period as a cryptographer. Following the war and using funding from the G.I. Bill, he began studying piano performance at the Peabody Conservatory in Baltimore. He quickly decided to switch to composition.

He earned bachelor's (1951) and master's (1953) degrees from Peabody, where his teachers included Nicolas Nabokov, Henry Cowell, and Hugo Weisgall. While there, he was briefly the music director of the Hilltop Musical Company, which Weisgall founded as a sort of answer to Benjamin Britten's festival at Aldeburgh—a venue for local composers (particularly Weisgall) to present new work. Argento gained broad exposure to and experience in the world of new opera. Hilltop's stage director was the writer John Olon-Scrymgeour, with whom Argento later collaborated on many operas. During this period, he also spent a year in Florence on a scholarship of the U.S.-Italy Fulbright Commission. He has called the experience "life-altering;" while there, he studied briefly with Luigi Dallapiccola.

Argento continued graduate studies and received his Ph.D. from the Eastman School of Music, where he studied with Alan Hovhaness, Bernard Rogers and Howard Hanson. Following completion of this degree, he received a Guggenheim Fellowship to study/work for another year in Florence. He established a tradition of spending long periods of time in that city.

Minnesota years 
Argento moved to Minneapolis in 1958 with his new wife, soprano Carolyn Bailey, to begin teaching theory and composition at the University of Minnesota. Within a few years, he received commissions from virtually every major performing group there. He has remarked that this constant feeling of strong community interest in his work made him feel particularly at home in Minnesota, although he had at first resisted moving there. For several years, he hoped to find a position on his native East Coast.

Argento became involved in writing music for productions at the then-new Guthrie Theater. In 1963, he and Scrymgeour founded the Center Opera Company, which later became the Minnesota Opera, to be in residence at the Guthrie. Argento composed the short opera The Masque of Angels for the occasion as the first Performing Arts commission of the Walker Art Center. This work—with its complex harmonic language and an emphasis on expansive choral writing that prefigures his later role as a prominent choral composer—firmly established his local prominence, as well as providing a role for his wife.

By 1971, when his daring, surreal opera Postcard from Morocco opened at Center Opera, Argento's national reputation was secure, in part thanks to a glowing review by the principal music critic of The New York Times. He eventually received commissions from New York City Opera, the newly formed Minnesota Opera, Washington Opera, and the Baltimore and St. Louis symphonies, among others. Argento also developed close professional relationships with several prominent singers, notably Frederica von Stade, Janet Baker, and Håkan Hagegård, tailoring some of his best-known song cycles to their talents.

Choral prominence and later life 
In the mid-1970s, Argento began writing choral works for the choir of Plymouth Congregational Church in Minneapolis, which his friend Philip Brunelle directed. The partnership with Brunelle was particularly fruitful, yielding commissions and premieres at Plymouth Church and at the Minnesota Opera, where Brunelle was Music Director. In this period Argento composed Jonah and the Whale (1973), co-commissioned by Plymouth Congregational Church and the Cathedral of St. Mark-Episcopal. He began to receive larger commissions for choral works, eventually composing major pieces for the Dale Warland Singers, The Buffalo Philharmonic Orchestra and Buffalo Schola Cantorum, and the Harvard and Yale glee clubs.

The recording by Frederica von Stade and the Minnesota Orchestra of his song cycle Casa Guidi won the 2004 Grammy Award for Best Contemporary Classical Composition. Argento's book Catalogue Raisonné as Memoir, an autobiographical discussion of his works, was published in 2004.

Argento retired from teaching but retained the title of Professor Emeritus at the University of Minnesota until his death. He lived in Minneapolis. The world premiere of Evensong: Of Love and Angels was presented by the Cathedral Choral Society in March 2008 at Washington National Cathedral. The work was written in memory of his late wife and in honor of the centennial of the Washington National Cathedral. In July 2014, the choral cycle "Seasons," setting texts by friend Pat Solstad, was premiered by the Minnesota Beethoven Festival Chorale in Winona, Minnesota, under the direction of longtime friend Dale Warland.

Argento died at his home in Minneapolis in 2019.

Works

Operas 

Argento's operatic output is eclectic and extensive. He withdrew two early operas, written while he was a student—Sicilian Limes and Colonel Jonathan the Saint. The Boor, written in 1957 as part of his Ph.D. work, was published by Boosey & Hawkes and performed in 2017. He collaborated with John Olon-Scrymgeour on a number of works, including The Masque of Angels; Christopher Sly (1962), based on an episode from The Taming of the Shrew; and The Shoemaker's Holiday, (1967) a "ballad opera" based on a play by Thomas Dekker.

After the success of Postcard from Morocco in 1971, which had a libretto by Jon Donahue, he received much larger commissions. The University of Minnesota and Minnesota Opera together commissioned The Voyage of Edgar Allan Poe in 1975-76, with a libretto by Charles Nolte. As a result of that work, which received wildly enthusiastic reviews, the New York City Opera commissioned him. He composed Miss Havisham's Fire (1977), with a libretto by Scrymgeour. It was not initially well-received, and Argento revised it into a one-act monodrama, Miss Havisham's Wedding Night, which the Minnesota Opera premiered on May 1, 1981, at the Tyrone Guthrie Theater in Minneapolis, conducted by Philip Brunelle. He revised Miss Havisham's Fire in 1995 and it has been successfully revived and performed since.

In 1984, the Minnesota Opera commissioned Casanova's Homecoming, with text by the composer; it went on to a well-received run at New York City Opera. At the insistence of Beverly Sills, then the company's musical director, the opera was the first in New York City to be performed in English with English supertitles. She wanted to ensure that the audience understood all the jokes. The opera won the 1986 National Institute for Music Theatre Award.

Argento next composed The Aspern Papers (1987) as a vehicle for Frederica von Stade, with his own libretto adapted from the 1888 novella by Henry James. His next opera and arguably largest work to date was The Dream of Valentino, which premiered at the Kennedy Center in 1993. Critic Anne Midgette of The New York Times has noted that Argento's operas tend to be very well received upon their premieres but lack an "easy popular hook" and are rarely revived.

Song cycles and "monodramas" 
Argento's song cycles are notable for his frequent use of dramatic, unusual text, most often prose that does not have immediately apparent musical possibilities. His works blur the distinction between straightforward groupings of songs and dramatic works, which he terms "monodramas". His best-known song cycle is From the Diary of Virginia Woolf, with a text he assembled from the book of that title. Written for Janet Baker in 1974, it won the Pulitzer Prize for Music and is performed frequently.

Other prominent works in a similar vein include Letters from Composers (1968), which uses as its text letters written by Chopin, Puccini, and others; Casa Guidi (1983), which sets letters written by Elizabeth Barrett Browning; and A Few Words About Chekhov (1996), which adapts letters by Anton Chekhov.

Argento's other song cycles are highly varied: 
A Water Bird Talk (1974–76) is a one-act monodrama adapted from Chekhov's "On the Harmful Effects of Tobacco," with images and passages from John James Audubon's Birds of America; 
The Andrée Expedition (1980) includes journal entries made by Swedish balloonist Salomon Andrée and excerpts from a personal diary and letters of his companion Nils Strindberg during their failed three-man expedition in 1897 to the North Pole by hydrogen balloon; and 
Miss Manners on Music (1998) sets to music newspaper clippings by American 20th-century advice columnist Judith Martin (aka "Miss Manners").
One of the few major song cycles Argento has written that use "traditional" verse as a text is his popular Six Elizabethan Songs.
Other solo vocal works by Argento include:
Songs About Spring (1950–55), text by E. E. Cummings, for voice and piano
Ode to the West Wind (1956), text by Percy Bysshe Shelley, for soprano and orchestra
To Be Sung Upon the Water (1972), text by William Wordsworth, for voice, clarinet and piano
The Bremen Town Musicians (1998), text by the composer, a "children's entertainment" with narrator and orchestra

Major choral works
Argento's The Masque of Angels (1963) has sections, such as the "Gloria" and "Sanctus", that are frequently excerpted and performed separately. His next major choral work was The Revelation of St. John the Divine (1968), which sets portions of the Book of Revelation from the Bible; it is scored for male chorus, brass, and an array of percussion instruments.

Peter Quince at the Clavier (1979), a setting of the poem by Wallace Stevens, was commissioned by Pennsylvania State University in honor of the state's tercentenary (both Stevens and Argento are Pennsylvania natives). For the Dale Warland Singers, Argento wrote I Hate and I Love (1981), with text by Catullus, and Walden Pond (1996), based on excerpts from Thoreau.

In 1987 Argento composed a massive Te Deum that integrates the Latin text with medieval English folk poetry. A Toccata of Galuppi's (1989), a 20-minute setting of a Robert Browning poem, is one of many works inspired by Argento's time in Florence. In 2008, the Harvard Glee Club premiered his Apollo in Cambridge, a multi-movement setting of texts by Harvard-affiliated writers of the 19th century.

Other choral works by Argento include:
A Nation of Cowslips (1968), seven bagatelles on nonsense text by Keats
Tria Carmina Pasachalia (1970), an Easter cantata for women's chorus
Jonah and the Whale (1973), a large-scale oratorio on medieval English texts
Spirituals and Swedish Chorales (1994)
Walden Pond: Nocturnes and Barcarolles (1997, SATB choir, 3 cellos, harp)
Dover Beach Revisited (2003), refers to the poem "Dover Beach" written by Victorian Matthew Arnold; Argento's work was composed for the Yale Glee Club
Four Seascapes (2004); words of Herman Melville, Mark Twain, Henry James, and Thornton Wilder set to music
Numerous anthems for choir and organ and a cappella motets
Evensong: Of Love and Angels (2008, full orchestra, SSAATTBB choir, two soprano soloists)
Seasons (2014, SATB choir a cappella)

Orchestral works 
Argento's non-vocal output is relatively small; there are no symphonies and just one string quartet, written when he was a student. He produced numerous orchestral suites based on his operas, including Le tombeau d'Edgar Poe (1985), adapted from The Voyage of Edgar Allan Poe, and the popular Valentino Dances (1994), from The Dream of Valentino. He wrote two ballets that were fashioned into orchestral suites, The Resurrection of Don Juan (1956) and Royal Invitation (Homage to the Queen of Tonga) (1964). His 1982 Fire Variations was nominated for the Kennedy Center's Friedheim Award in Music.

Other orchestral works include:
Divertimento (1954) for piano and strings
Variations for Orchestra (The Mask of Night) (1965)
Bravo Mozart (1969), an "imaginary biography"
A Ring of Time (1972) for orchestra and bells
In Praise of Music (1977), a set of "songs" for orchestra
Capriccio ‘Rossini in Paris’ (1985), essentially a clarinet concerto
Reverie (Reflections on a Hymn Tune) (1997)
Other small works for chamber groups of instruments

Discography 
 In Praise of Music (1977), with the Minnesota Orchestra, conducted by Eiji Oue, Reference Recordings, 2002
 Casa Guidi (1983), with Frederica von Stade and the Minnesota Orchestra, conducted by Eiji Oue, Reference Recordings, 2002
 Capriccio for Clarinet and Orchestra (1986), with Burt Hara and the Minnesota Orchestra, conducted by Eiji Oue, Reference Recordings, 2002
 Dominick Argento: Three Works; Odyssey Opera of Boston, Studio Recording, released in 2019 - The Boor, Miss Havisham’s Wedding Night, A Water Bird Talk, conducted by Gil Rose
 Walden Pond (1997), The Dale Warland Singers, Gothic Records, 2003

Notes

External links
A radio biography of Argento
Profile, Boosey & Hawkes
Walden Pond by the Dale Warland Singers
Review of 2015 Walden Pond performance by the Minnesota Beethoven Festival Chorale under Dale Warland
Interview with Dominick Argento, June 6, 1986
2017 performance notes of "The Boor" with the Metropolitan Symphony Orchestra

1927 births
2019 deaths
20th-century classical composers
21st-century classical composers
American male classical composers
American classical composers
Eastman School of Music alumni
George Peabody Medal winners
Grammy Award winners
American people of Italian descent
American opera composers
Male opera composers
Musicians from York, Pennsylvania
Pulitzer Prize for Music winners
Peabody Institute alumni
University of Minnesota faculty
Pupils of Bernard Rogers
Pupils of Howard Hanson
21st-century American composers
Pupils of Luigi Dallapiccola
20th-century American composers
Classical musicians from Pennsylvania
20th-century American male musicians
21st-century American male musicians
Members of the American Academy of Arts and Letters